The  is a nuclear power plant in the city of Omaezaki in Shizuoka Prefecture, on Japan's east coast, 200 km south-west of Tokyo. It is managed by the Chubu Electric Power Company. There are five units contained at a single site with a net area of 1.6 km2 (395 acres). A sixth unit began construction on December 22, 2008. On January 30, 2009, Hamaoka-1 and Hamaoka-2 were permanently shut down.

On 6 May 2011, Prime Minister Naoto Kan requested the plant be shut down as an earthquake of magnitude 8.0 or higher was estimated 87% likely to hit the area within the following 30 years. Kan wanted to avoid a possible repeat of the Fukushima nuclear disaster. On 9 May 2011, Chubu Electric decided to comply with the government request. In July 2011, a mayor in Shizuoka Prefecture and a group of residents filed a lawsuit seeking the decommissioning of the reactors at the Hamaoka nuclear power plant permanently.

Earthquake susceptibility

Hamaoka is built directly over the subduction zone near the junction of two tectonic plates, and a major Tōkai earthquake is said to be overdue. The possibility of such a shallow magnitude 8.0 earthquake in the Tokai region was pointed out by Kiyoo Mogi in 1969, 7 months before permission to construct the Hamaoka plant was sought, and by the Coordinating Committee for Earthquake Prediction (CCEP) in 1970, prior to the permission being granted on December 10, 1970. As a consequence, Professor Katsuhiko Ishibashi, a former member of a government panel on nuclear reactor safety, claimed in 2004 that Hamaoka was 'considered to be the most dangerous nuclear power plant in Japan' with the potential to create a genpatsu-shinsai (domino-effect nuclear power plant earthquake disaster). In 2007, following the 2007 Chūetsu offshore earthquake, Dr Mogi, by then chair of Japan's Coordinating Committee for Earthquake Prediction, called for the immediate closure of the plant.

On 6 May 2011, Japanese prime minister Naoto Kan asked Chubu Electric Power Company, which operates the Hamaoka plant, to halt reactors No. 4 and No. 5, and not to restart reactor No. 3 which was then offline for regular inspection. Kan said that a science ministry panel on earthquake research has projected an 87% possibility of a magnitude-8-class earthquake hitting the region within 30 years. He said that considering the unique location of the Hamaoka plant, the operator must draw up and implement mid-to-long-term plans to ensure the reactors can withstand the projected Tōkai earthquake and any triggered tsunami. Kan also said that until such plans are implemented, all the reactors should remain out of operation. Chubu Electric has decided to comply with the government request on 9 May 2011. The Yomiuri Shimbun, one of Japan's largest newspapers, criticized Kan and his request, calling it "abrupt" and noting the difficulty towards Chubu Electric's shareholders and further stated Kan "should seriously reflect on the way he made his request". Yomiuri followed up with an article that wondered how dangerous Hamaoka really was and claimed the request was "a political judgment that went beyond technological worthiness". The next day damage to the pipes inside the condenser were discovered following a leak of seawater into the reactor.

The plant has been designed to withstand an earthquake of magnitude 8.5.

On 22 July 2011 plans were unfolded to build an 18-meter-high embankment by December 2012 to prevent tsunami damage to the facility. This would protect the reactors against waves higher than the waves that occurred in the Fukushima Daiichi nuclear power plant on 11 March 2011. The barrier would also be 10 meters taller than the highest waves expected in the area in the event of 3 major earthquakes occurring at the same time. Plans were studied to build a new embankment 1.5 kilometers along the coast by the plant. Next to this a waterproof building was planned to house a backup-pump and also the wall around the reactors was extended. Overall costs of the plans: 1.3 billion dollars.

Reactor data

Performance
The plant showed stellar performance through the 1990s, however, problems that caused Unit 1 to be shut down from 2001 to present, and Unit 2 from 2005 to present significantly hurt the capacity factor figures in the recent history of the plant.

Unit 1 HPCI Rupture
On November 7, 2001, a valve in the HPCI system of Unit 1 ruptured during a Periodical-manual-startup-test. Since this is considered a part of the ECCS, the implications reach further than the event itself, and drew into question the reliability of the emergency safety system. Unit 2 was also shut down for the purpose of investigating similar structures.

Unit 5 Steam Turbine Problems
Too recent to cover the entire relevant time frame in the data above, on June 15, 2006 Unit 5 was shut down due to excessive turbine vibrations. It was discovered that a number of turbine vanes had actually completely broken off. In the turbine that failed, nearly all vanes showed fractures or cracking while the majority of the vanes of the other two low pressure turbines also showed problems. Fault for the problems was placed on Hitachi, the NSSS supplier.

Previous events
 1991, April 4 – Unit 3 reactor coolant supply lowered, automatic SCRAM
 2001, November 7 – Unit 1 pipe burst accident
 2001, November 9 – Unit 1 coolant leak accident
 2002 – In an independent inspection, it was discovered that 16 unique signs of cracks in steam pipes were known by the utility but failed to report to the prefecture level authorities.
 2002, May 24 – Unit 2 water leak
 2004, February 21 – Unit 2 outbreak of fire in room above turbine room.
 2004, August – Unit 4 problem with fabrication of data by utility.
 2005, November 4 – Unit 1 pipe leak incident
 2005, November 16 – Unit 3 outside pipe leak due to corrosion
 2005, November 16 – Unit 1 spent fuel pool had foreign matter detected in it
 2006, June – Unit 5 damage to turbine blades
 2007, March – Utility admitted to 14 cases of unfair business practices
 2009, August 11 – Units 4 and 5 (the only ones operating) automatically shut down due to an earthquake
 2011, May 6 – Prime minister Naoto Kan orders Units 4 and 5 to be shut down and Unit 3 not to be restarted
 2011, May 15 – 400 tons of seawater were found to have leaked into the Unit 5 turbine steam condenser
 2011, May 20 – Damaged pipes were located in the Unit 5 condenser, and the operator estimated that about five tons of seawater may have entered the reactor itself.

Mayoral elections in Omaezaki city April 2012
In Omaezaki city, restarting or decommissioning the Hamaoka nuclear power plant became a big issue in campaigning for the 15 April 2012 mayoral election. Of three candidates, the sitting mayor Shigeo Ishihara was willing to grant a restart, after consultation with the city residents and taking into account the "lessons learned form the Fukushima crisis", if he were re-elected for a third term. Haruhisa Muramatsu, a travel agent and member of the Japanese communist party, said that the plant should be decommissioned, and the third candidate Katsuhisa Mizuno, a former city councilor, promised that the power plant would not be taken into service, if he should win the election. Ishihara was re-elected.

See also 

 List of nuclear power plants in Japan

References

External links

Chubu Electric Power Company Hamaoka NPP page
静岡県総務部防災局（浜岡原子力発電所の事故・トラブル関連のページ）
浜岡原発､巨大地震対策虹のネットワーク

1970s establishments in Japan
Nuclear power stations in Japan
Buildings and structures in Shizuoka Prefecture
Nuclear power stations using advanced boiling water reactors
Chubu Electric Power
Omaezaki, Shizuoka